Rajko Vujadinović (born 13 April 1956) is a retired Montenegrin footballer who played as a forward for clubs in Yugoslavia and Greece.

Playing career
Born in Nikšić, Vujadinović began playing football for FK Sutjeska Nikšić before moving to NK Dinamo Zagreb in the Yugoslav First League. He joined FK Vojvodina in early 1979, and would appear in 84 league matches in six seasons with the club.

In 1984, Vujadinović joined Greek Superleague side Doxa Drama for one season. He moved to fellow Superleague club Panachaiki for the following three seasons.

References

External links
ΞΕΝΟΙ ΠΑΙΚΤΕΣ ΚΑΙ ΠΡΟΠΟΝΗΤΕΣ ΤΗΣ ΠΑΝΑΧΑΪΚΗΣ
NKDZ: History: Squads by seasons

1956 births
Living people
Footballers from Nikšić
Association football forwards
Yugoslav footballers
FK Sutjeska Nikšić players
GNK Dinamo Zagreb players
FK Vojvodina players
Doxa Drama F.C. players
Panachaiki F.C. players
Yugoslav First League players
Super League Greece players
Yugoslav expatriate footballers
Expatriate footballers in Greece
Yugoslav expatriate sportspeople in Greece